The Waratahs are a men's Australian field hockey team, representing New South Wales in the Australian Hockey League, they play at the Sydney Olympic Park Hockey Centre.

Season standings

Current squad

References

External links

 http://www.hockeynsw.com.au/

Australian field hockey clubs
War
Sports teams in Sydney
Field hockey in New South Wales